The Archdiocese of Winnipeg is a Latin Church ecclesiastical territory or archdiocese of the Catholic Church that includes part of the Province of Manitoba, Canada. The archdiocese is the only diocese of the Latin Church in Canada that is immediately exempt to the Holy See, as it is not part of an ecclesiastical province.

As of 2010, the archdiocese contains 92 parishes, 60 active diocesan priests, 26 religious priests, and 166,000 Catholics. It also has 27 religious brothers, 113 religious sisters, and 19 permanent deacons. The cathedral of the archdiocese is St. Mary's Cathedral in Winnipeg. The archbishop since 2014 is Richard Gagnon.

Bishops
The following is a list of the bishops and archbishops of Winnipeg and their terms of service:
Arthur Alfred Sinnott (1915–1952)
Philip Francis Pocock (1952–1961), appointed Coadjutor Archbishop of Toronto, Ontario
George Flahiff (1960–1982)
Adam Exner (1982–1991), appointed Archbishop of Vancouver, British Columbia
Leonard James Wall (1992–2000)
James Weisgerber (2000–2013)
Richard Gagnon (2014–present)

Coadjutor bishop
 Gerald C. Murray (1944-1951), did not succeed to the see
 Philip Francis Pocock (1951-1952)

Auxiliary bishop
Francis Ryder Wood (1940-1943?), did not take effect

Priests of this diocese who became bishops
 Charles Aimé Halpin, appointed Archbishop of Regina in 1973

See also

 Roman Catholic Archdiocese of Saint Boniface
 Ukrainian Catholic Archeparchy of Winnipeg

References

Notes

Bibliography
 Archdiocese of Winnipeg page at catholichierarchy.org retrieved July 14, 2006

External links
 

Catholic Church in Manitoba
Roman Catholic Ecclesiastical Province of Winnipeg
Winnipeg dioceses